Blue balls is slang for an uncomfortable testicular sensation that can occur during a state of male sexual arousal. The term is thought to have originated in the United States, first appearing in 1916. Another slang term used for the condition is lover's nuts. Some urologists call this condition epididymal hypertension or sexual arousal orchialgia.

Most often it describes a temporary fluid congestion (vasocongestion) in the testicles, caused by prolonged sexual arousal in the human male without ejaculation.

Research
The phenomenon is sometimes associated with certain demographics, such as men who are experiencing and practicing delayed, multiple or inhibited ejaculation.

There is scant information on the phenomenon in scientific literature.

A brief article by Chalett and Nerenberg in Pediatrics agrees that little formal data exists regarding the condition. The article concludes that "the treatment is sexual release, or perhaps straining to move a very heavy object—in essence doing a Valsalva maneuver."

Causes 
The cause of blue balls is a large amount of blood circulation to the genital area, specifically the penis and testicles, without the release of tension associated with orgasm/ejaculation. When a large amount of blood flows to the genital region, the penis becomes erect and the testicles also experience increased blood flow and swelling.

Other causes of painful symptoms include:

 diabetic neuropathy in the groin area
 epididymitis, which is an inflammation of the testicles
 infection, which is usually accompanied by inflammation
 kidney stones
 mumps
 orchitis
 testicular cancer

It may also be a sign of testicular torsion, which often requires emergency surgery.

Symptoms 
The following indications and symptoms in the testicles may be experienced by people with blue balls:

 heaviness
 aching
 discomfort or mild pain

See also
 Delayed ejaculation
 Edging (sexual practice)
 Erotic sexual denial
 Prostatic congestion
 Sexual frustration

References

External links 

 "Understanding Male Sexuality"
 "Blue Balls" by DiscoveryHealth.com writers
 "Blue Balls" by Paul Aitken at AltPenis.com on vasocongestion
 "Blue Balls: Understanding Epididymal Hypertension"

Mammal male reproductive system
Sexual slang